Rize 106.7 FM is a privately owned Nigerian radio station located in Warri, Delta State.

References 

Radio stations in Nigeria
Radio stations in Africa